Glencara is a village in County Westmeath, Ireland. It is located at the crossroads of the R389 and the L5342, to the west of Mullingar.

The Hill of Uisneach stands to the south of the town.

Glencara House, an early 19th century Country house, once owned by the Kelly and Hume families, stands to the south of the crossroads.

See also 

 List of towns and villages in Ireland

References 

Towns and villages in County Westmeath